Edward Deering Mansfield (August 17, 1801 —October 27, 1880), was an American author.

Biography
Mansfield was born in New Haven, Connecticut, son of Jared Mansfield. He graduated from West Point in 1818, but declined to enter the army and studied at Princeton, from which he graduated in 1822. In 1825 he was admitted to the Connecticut bar. He afterward removed to Cincinnati, and in 1836 became professor of constitutional law at Cincinnati College. Shortly afterward, however, he abandoned the legal profession to engage in journalism, and edited successively the [[Cincinnati Chronicle|Cincinnati Chronicle]] (1836–49), Atlas (1849–52), and Railroad Record (1854–72). While editing the Chronicle and Atlas he introduced many young writers to the public, among whom was Harriet Beecher Stowe. He was Commissioner of Statistics for the State of Ohio from 1859 to 1868 and was a member of the Société française de statistique universelle. He published:

 Political Grammar of the United States (1835)
 Life of Gen. Winfield Scott (1848)
 History of the Mexican War (1849)
 American Education (1851)
 Memoirs of Daniel Drake (1855)
 A Popular Life of Ulysses S. Grant (1868)
 Personal Memories (1870), an interesting social and political chronicle reaching to the year 1841

Mansfield died at his country home called Yamoyden'' near Morrow, Ohio.

Notes

External links
Short biography

1801 births
1880 deaths
American biographers
19th-century American historians
19th-century American newspaper editors
Writers from New Haven, Connecticut
Lawyers from Cincinnati
Princeton University alumni
United States Military Academy alumni
Writers from Cincinnati
University of Cincinnati College of Law faculty
Ohio lawyers
American male journalists
19th-century American male writers
Journalists from Ohio
19th-century American lawyers
American male biographers